Urodera crucifera is a species of case-bearing leaf beetle in the family Chrysomelidae. It is found in Central America and North America.

Subspecies
These two subspecies belong to the species Urodera crucifera:
 Urodera crucifera crucifera
 Urodera crucifera texana Schaeffer, 1919

References

Further reading

 

Clytrini
Articles created by Qbugbot
Beetles described in 1848